Stenella africana is a species of anamorphic fungi.

Description
Belonging to the Stenella genus, this species is a Cercospora-like fungus with a superficial secondary mycelium, solitary conidiophores, conidiogenous cells with thickened and darkened conidiogenous loci and catenate or single conidia with dark, slightly thickened hila.

See also
Stenella iteae
Stenella constricta
Stenella uniformis
Stenella vermiculata
Stenella capparidicola
Stenella gynoxidicola

References

Further reading

External links

africana
Fungi described in 1982